Robin Beck (born 1953) is an American former triathlete who won the 1980 Hawaii Ironman Triathlon.

Results

References 

1953 births
American female triathletes
Ironman world champions
Living people

Place of birth missing (living people)
20th-century American women